Petradoria is a genus of North American subshrubs in the tribe Astereae within the family Asteraceae.

Species
The only known species is Petradoria pumila, known by the common name rock goldenrod. It is native to the western United States (California, Arizona, Nevada, Utah, New Mexico, Colorado, Wyoming, Idaho). It is quite common in some regions, carpeting areas in yellow blooms.

Formerly included
Petradoria discoidea L.C.Anderson - Cuniculotinus gramineus (H.M.Hall) Urbatsch, R.P.Roberts & Neubig

Subspecies
 Petradoria pumila subsp. pumila
 Petradoria pumila subsp. graminea (Wooton & Standl.) L.C.Anderson

References

External links 
Jepson Manual Treatment: ssp. pumila
USDA Plants Profile
Southwest Colorado Wildflowers

Astereae
Flora of the Western United States
Monotypic Asteraceae genera
Flora without expected TNC conservation status